Gift of the Givers (founded as Waqful Waqifin) is a South African non-governmental organisation and disaster relief group, and Africa's largest independent humanitarian organisation. It was established to offer disaster relief and response, together with other humanitarian work, with the aim to reach people worldwide. The organisation’s profile in South Africa grew during the 2010s and 2020s, due to challenges faced by the government in delivering services, including disaster relief.

Humanitarian efforts
Gift of the Givers has worked in many parts of world, including Gaza City, Bosnia, Somalia, Haiti and Zimbabwe. During the aftermath of the 2010 Haiti earthquake the organisation sent four rescue teams and aid materials to the country. They provided in 2011 food aid to Somalia, by airlifting 180 tons and shipping 2000 tons of aid. Through Gift of the Givers, South African medics and volunteers have been assisting people during the Syrian civil war. Because of unrest in Syria some of the South Africans were injured or killed. In 2013, victims of flooding in the Karonga region of Malawi were given aid in the form of food. In 2015, after 176 died during flooding of the Shire Valley, and with thousands homeless, the organisation provided assistance for citizens in southern Malawi.

Imtiaz Sooliman 

The founder of the organisation is Imtiaz Ismail Sooliman, a South African medical doctor. He also led the organisation.

Early life and education
Sooliman was born on 7 March 1962 in Potchefstroom, a Muslim. He completed his high school education at Sastri College in Durban, Natal in 1978. He qualified as a medical doctor by obtaining his MBChB at the University of Natal. He ran a medical practise in Pietermaritzburg, Natal up to 1986. He is married to Zohra.

Career
Sooliman's drive for the establishing of Gift of the Givers, was the instruction of a Sufi sheik, Muhammed Safer Dal Effendi of the Jerrahi tariqah, which happened in Istanbul, Turkey on 6 August 1992. His organisation is funded by normal South Africans. Some of the projects where he has been involved include:
Pierre Korkie – Trying via negotiations to free a teacher, who was held by militants from al-Qaeda in the Arabian Peninsula. Korkie died in the rescue attempt
Iraq – Helping local citizen in the aftermath of the war between Iraq and forces of the US and the UK
Mauritania – Building a centre and nursery for woman and children
Syria – Delivered supplies to refugees in the Idlib region where a war was on-going
Nepal – Rescue operations after an April earthquake
South Africa – Beaufort West and Fraserburg- Assisting the towns with the water crisis.

Recognition
19 October 1993 – President's Order of the Star of South Africa from President F.W. De Klerk, which is the highest civilian award in the country.
25 April 1997 – Pietermaritzburg City Council Civic Commendation Award from President Nelson Mandela for Outstanding Community Service.
30 June 2006 – Presidential Award, Tamgha-i-Eisaar, from the President of Pakistan, Pervez Musharraf, for Pakistan Earthquake
28 November 2008 – South African Medical Association Excellence in Health Care Award
18 November 2009 – Recognised as one of 500 of the world's most influential Muslims in a book by Professor John Esposito of Georgetown University, USA.
1 April 2016 – Honorary Doctorate from Rhodes University, In Grahamstown, South Africa.
7 September 2017 – Chancellor's Medal from the University of Pretoria.
1 February 2018 – FW de Klerk Foundation presented him with the Goodwill Award
20 March 2018 – Honorary Doctorate from the University of Stellenbosch for the establishment of the Gift of the Givers.
21 June 2018 – Standard Bank KwaZulu-Natal Top Business Award

References

External links

Organizations established in 1992
Development charities based in South Africa